Flora Iberica: Plantas vasculares de la Península Ibérica e Islas Baleares ("Vascular plants of the Iberian Peninsula and Balearic Islands") is a Spanish scientific journal specializing in botany. It was established in 1980. It is published by the Real Jardín Botánico de Madrid.

References

Botany in Europe
Flora of Spain
Spanish-language journals
Publications established in 1980
1980 establishments in Spain